The Malt Shovel is a Grade II listed public house at Iver Lane, Cowley, London.

It was built early 19th century. It is now called The Malt Shovel.

References

Grade II listed buildings in the London Borough of Hillingdon
Grade II listed pubs in London
Pubs in the London Borough of Hillingdon
Cowley, London